Henry Hack Eibel (December 6, 1893 – October 16, 1945) was a utility player in Major League Baseball who played for the Cleveland Naps and Boston Red Sox. He was born in Brooklyn, New York to emigrant parents of German extraction. Eibel first played in the majors at the age of 18.

During his brief major league career, Eibel did almost everything a player was asked to do, appearing in 30 games, as a relief pitcher (3 games), left fielder (3), right fielder (3), first baseman (1), and pinch-hitter or pinch-runner (20).

In a two-season career, Eibel was a .174 hitter (8-for-43) with four runs and six RBI, including two doubles and one stolen base. He did not hit a home run. In three relief appearances, he posted a 3.48 ERA with five strikeouts and three walks in 10⅓ innings and did not have a decision.

Eibel shot himself to death in Macon, Georgia at age 51. Macon was also the town of Eibel's final professional ball club team. Eibel retired from baseball in 1924.

References

Sources
 Baseball Reference

Boston Red Sox players
Cleveland Naps players
Major League Baseball outfielders
Major League Baseball pitchers
1893 births
1945 suicides
Minor league baseball managers
Dayton Veterans players
Saginaw Ducks players
Atlanta Crackers players
Memphis Chickasaws players
Richmond Climbers players
Richmond Virginians (minor league) players
Shreveport Gassers players
Galveston Sand Crabs players
Macon Peaches players
Sportspeople from Brooklyn
Baseball players from New York City
American people of German descent
Suicides by firearm in Georgia (U.S. state)